At Sword's Point, also known as The Sons of the Three Musketeers, is a 1952 American historical action adventure film directed by Lewis Allen and starring Cornel Wilde and Maureen O'Hara. It was shot in Technicolor by RKO Radio Pictures. The film was completed in 1949, but was not released until 1952.

The Three Musketeers' offsprings of Aramis, Porthos, D'Artagnan and Claire, the daughter of Athos, are reunited by the ageing Queen Anne to halt the villainy of her treacherous nephew, the Duc de Lavalle.

Plot
The sons (and a daughter) of the original Four Musketeers ride to the rescue of besieged Queen Anne in 1648 France.

D'Artagnan and his companions are alerted that the terminally ill Queen (Gladys Cooper) is being pressured by the evil Duc de Lavalle (Robert Douglas) into agreeing to a marriage with Princess Henriette (Nancy Gates). Too old (or dead) to respond, their sons (and one daughter) race to Court to help.

After much derring do – including episodes of imprisonment and betrayal, with a burgeoning love sub-plot between D'Artagnan Jr. and Claire, daughter of Athos (Maureen O'Hara) thrown in for good measure – they succeed.

Cast
 Cornel Wilde as D'Artagnan
 Maureen O'Hara as Claire
 Robert Douglas as Duc de Lavalle
 Gladys Cooper as Queen Anne
 June Clayworth as Comtesse Claudine
 Dan O'Herlihy as Aramis
 Alan Hale Jr. as Porthos
 Blanche Yurka as Madame Michom
 Nancy Gates as Princess Henriette
 Edmund Breon as Queen's Chamberlain 
 Peter Miles as Young Louis XIV
 George Petrie as Chalais
 Moroni Olsen as Porthos
 Lucien Littlefield as Cpl. Gautier (uncredited)

Production
In 1947 Republic Pictures announced they had purchased a script, Sons of the Musketeers by Aubrey Wisberg and Jack Pollexfen. Eagle Lion also announced they would make a film called Sons of the Musketeers which concerned MGM who were making a version of The Three Musketeers. Eventually the project went to RKO where it was set up as a vehicle for Cornel Wilde. Lewis Allen was announced as director on 15 November 1949.

Filming started 14 December 1949.

MGM had some difficulties depicting Cardinal Richelieu in The Three Musketeers so the filmmakers decided to not show Cardinal Mazarin, even though he was in the original script.

Notes
 Porthos in At Sword's Point is played by Moroni Olsen, who played that character in his younger days in the 1935 film of the original 1844 Alexander Dumas novel, The Three Musketeers while Alan Hale Jr. plays the son of Porthos. His father, Alan Hale, Sr., appeared in The Man in the Iron Mask (1939) as an aging Porthos.
 In another Three Musketeers movie, The Fifth Musketeer (1979), which retells the story of The Man in the Iron Mask, two of the young Musketeers from At Sword's Point reappear in the roles of their own fathers: Cornel Wilde stars as D'Artagnan and Alan Hale Jr. as Porthos.

References

External links 
 
 
 

1952 films
1950s action adventure films
1950s historical films
American action adventure films
American historical films
Films directed by Lewis Allen
RKO Pictures films
Films scored by Roy Webb
Films based on Twenty Years After
Films set in Paris
Films set in France
Films set in the 1640s
Cultural depictions of Louis XIV
Films with screenplays by Aubrey Wisberg
1950s English-language films
1950s American films